Qeshlaq-e Sumuklu may refer to:
Qeshlaq-e Sumuklu Heydar
Qeshlaq-e Sumuklu Mayir